Richard Hittleman (7 March 1927 – 14 October 1991) was an American Yoga teacher and author who taught Hatha and Raja Yoga through one of the first Yoga television series, Yoga for Health.

Early life

Richard Lowell Hittleman was born at New York on 7 March 1927, the son of Hittleman and Fillet. Hittleman was a pupil of the Indian spiritual master Ramana Maharshi, along with Paul Brunton, in the late 1940s. He also had an interest in Zen Buddhism, and Buddhism generally. He is said to have been working with his daughter on a re-interpretation of the Tibetan Book of the Dead at the time of his death. His chief teaching was that ultimately all is only divine self (the Hindu atman) and that this was present in all people, to be realized through meditation and other yoga techniques. Hittleman wrote: "'Self' is another word for 'God'. This is the God who is the Absolute, immutable, without qualities, pure Awareness, without beginning or end."

Career in yoga 

Richard Hittleman specialized in introducing Yoga in an easy-to-follow fashion to those who were new to the subject. Through his books, lectures, recordings and TV programs, he brought Yoga to more people than any other person alive at the time. He was most active in the 1960s and 1970s. It has been said that Richard Hittleman introduced Yoga to literally millions of people via the medium of television. His method was to start with the most elementary Hatha Yoga postures and gradually bring the student into more advanced physical asanas and the more profound Yoga philosophy of Advaita Vedanta. So popular did his Yoga For Health TV programmes become that "... the programs were repeated again and again - indeed, in New York 'Yoga for Health' was screened for more than four-and-a-half years without a break".

Hittleman stated his philosophy as follows: "In the Yoga scriptures, it is explained that the word "Self" is used to indicate that the Absolute we are attempting to describe is Self-luminous. It shines by its own light that has no beginning and no end. It is dependent upon nothing and is not affected by, nor does it react to, any occurrence in the phenomenal world. It is further characterized as having the qualities of Bliss and Knowledge. That is, when you manifest as that which you truly Are, the experience is one of unqualified Joy and direct (not relative) Knowledge."

He wrote numerous popular books on Hatha Yoga, and several covering Yoga philosophy. His style was lucid and readable for newcomers, yet with profound content; he had taken an M.A. in Oriental mysticism at Columbia University and was a friend of Alan Watts.

There were two later series of "Yoga for Health". One was a co production with KTEH, San Jose, starring Hittleman as the instructor and master, with a male model demonstrating intermediate posture  and a female model demonstrating beginning postures. The title of the second series was "Yoga and Meditation." the second series was a 1/2 hour shows one for each week or 52 shows. This series covered virtually all types of yoga instructions Bhakti, Hatha, Raja and Karma as well. Each show started with introductions of guests, and instructions of poses. last 1/2 of the show was devoted to lectures on yoga types, foods, and life styles. also several shows had lectures on very many meditation technics and styles, deep breathing, deep relaxation. he also lectured on "White light healing." These shows were produced by Mort Levit and Gabreal Franklin. A later, and last series, was produced by Mort Levit, and directed by Gabreal Franklin at KMST Studios.

Death
Hittleman died of prostate cancer on 14 October 1991 at Santa Cruz.

Books 

Richard Hittleman's Introduction to Yoga, Bantam Books, August 18, 1997
Yoga for Health, Ballantine Books, March 12, 1985
Richard Hittleman's Yoga: 28 Day Exercise Plan, Workman Publishing, 1969 (Bantam, 1983 )
Guide for the Seeker, Bantam Books, 1978  
Richard Hittleman's Guide to Yoga Meditation, Bantam Books, 1969
Yoga Philosophy and Meditation, 1964
Yoga at Home, 1962
Yoga: The 8 Steps to Health and Peace
Yoga for Physical Fitness
Yoga for Personal Living
Be Young With Yoga
Yoga Natural Foods Cookbook
Richard Hittleman's 30 Day Yoga Meditation Plan
Weight control through Yoga
Richard Hittleman's Yoga for Total Fitness
The Yoga Way to Figure and Facial Beauty
The Yoga Way
Yoga U.S.A: The unique exercise system 10 million Americans believe
Yoga for Special Problems

References

American yoga teachers
1927 births
1991 deaths